Gymnastics, for the 2017 Island Games, held at the Sävehallen, Visby, Gotland, Sweden in June 2017.

General 
The last time gymnastics was an event in the Island Games was in 2013, an event that was dominated by the Isle of Man who took 17 of the 25 gold medals.

Bermuda has named a team of five, aged between 13 and 15. 2017 will be the first time Gotland has put forward a team to compete in a gymnastics event.

Medal table

Results

Men's FIG events

Men's SET events

Women's FIG events

Women's SET events

References

Island
2017
Gymnastics